Klaasen is Dutch patronymic surname ("son of Klaas"). Notable people with this name include:

 Arno Klaassen (born 1979), Dutch bobsledder
 Davy Klaassen (born 1993), Dutch footballer
 Jozef Klaassen (born 1983), Dutch rower
 (1920–1992), Dutch economist
 Mihkel Klaassen (1880–1952), Estonian Supreme Court judge
Nel Klaassen (1906–1989), Dutch sculptor
 René Klaassen (born 1961), Dutch field hockey player
 Ryan Klaassen, lead plaintiff in the 2021 vaccine law case Klaassen v. Indiana University

Klaassens
 Jan Klaassens (1931–1983), Dutch footballer

See also
 Klaasen
 Claassen
 Klassen
, the Dutch puppet version of Pulcinella (Mister Punch)

Dutch-language surnames
Patronymic surnames
Surnames from given names